Musayev, Musaev, Muzayev or Muzaev (Russian: Мусаев, Музаев) is a Turkic masculine surname originating from the masculine given name Musa, its feminine counterpart is Musayeva, Musaeva, Muzayeva or Muzaeva. The surname may refer to

Bakhtiyar Musayev (born 1973), Azerbaijani football midfielder 
Beibulat Musaev (born 1977), Belarusian wrestler 
Fakhraddin Musayev (1957–1992), Azerbaijani military officer
Fozil Musaev (born 1989), Uzbekistani footballer
Leon Musayev (born 1999), Russian football player
Magomed Musaev (born 1989), Russian-Kyrgyzstani freestyle wrestler 
Mardan Musayev (1907–1982), Azerbaijani Red Army officer
Murad Musayev (born 1983), Russian football coach 
Naila Musayeva (born 1957), Azerbaijani scientist
Niyameddin Musayev (born 1940), Azerbaijani pop singer 
Olokhan Musayev (born 1979), Azerbaijani Paralympian athlete 
Richard Muzaev (born 1992), Russian tennis player 
Ruslan Musayev (born 1979), Azerbaijani football player 
Samir Musayev (born 1979), Azerbaijani football player 
Sevgil Musayeva-Borovyk, journalist from Crimea 
Shahin Musayev, Deputy Minister of Defense of Azerbaijan
Tarlan Musayeva (born 1955), Azerbaijani politician 
Vahid Musayev (died 1999), Deputy Minister of Defense of Azerbaijan 
Shahzoda (Zilola Musayeva, born 1979), Uzbek singer and actress

See also

References

Surnames of Turkmenistan origin
Turkmen-language surnames
Azerbaijani-language surnames
Kazakh-language surnames
Kyrgyz-language surnames
Russian-language surnames
Tajik-language surnames
Uzbek-language surnames
Surnames of Kyrgyzstani origin
Surnames of Kazakhstani origin
Surnames of Uzbekistani origin
Surnames of Tajikistani origin
Patronymic surnames
Surnames from given names